Zambo or Zámbó is a surname. Notable people with the surname include:

André-Frank Zambo Anguissa (born 1995), Cameroonian football midfielder 
Bence Zámbó (born 1989), Hungarian football player 
Gundis Zámbó (born 1966), German actress of Austrian and Hungarian origins
Jean Zambo (born 1959), Cameroonian handball coach
Jimmy Zámbó (1958–2001), Hungarian pop singer
Lawrence Zámbó (died 1402), Hungarian cleric 
Mballa Zambo (born 1987), Cameroonian football goalkeeper 
Nicholas Zámbó (died 1395), Hungarian treasurer and judge, uncle of Lawrence 
Sándor Zámbó (born 1944), Hungarian footballer

See also
Zamba (name)
Zambo (disambiguation)

Hungarian-language surnames
Surnames of African origin